Cyrus Harding Walker (January 27, 1859 – February 23, 1934) was an American lawyer and Democratic politician. First elected to the Virginia Senate in 1898 after a brief stint in the House of Delegates, he went on to serve in this body for the next two decades. For the last five years of his tenure as the 34th district's senator, he was the President pro tempore of the Senate of Virginia.

Early life and education
Walker was born in Northumberland County, Virginia on January 27, 1859. He was the third child of William Wright Walker, an attorney, and Clara Rebecca Walker (née Harding). He received a law degree from the University of Virginia; while there, he was a member of the Eta chapter of the Phi Kappa Sigma fraternity. Remaining active in the affairs of the school up until his death, he served on its Board of Visitors from 1917 to 1934 and as the rector from 1922 to 1930.

Career

From 1883 to 1893, after graduating from law school, Walker taught at Davis Military School in North Carolina.

After being elected on the Democratic ticket in 1897 to the Virginia House of Delegates, Walker served one full two-year term, representing Northumberland and Westmoreland counties. As was typical in the late nineteenth to early twentieth century, the Democrats had an overwhelming majority in the state's legislature.

In 1898, Harding was elected to the Virginia Senate for the 34th district, which was then composed of King George, Richmond, Westmoreland, Northumberland, and Lancaster. By then a leader in local politics, he was elected to participate in the 1901-1902 Virginia Constitutional Convention. With the death of former lieutenant governor and then-senior senator Edward Echols, the office of President pro tempore was vacant. Walker was elected by his peers to take Echols's place.

Personal life
Walker married Mary Rosa Starke in 1887. The couple had two sons, Henry and George, and one daughter, Marie. Their historic home, Oakley, in Heathsville is on the National Register of Historic Places.

References

External links
 

1859 births
1934 deaths
Democratic Party Virginia state senators
People from Northumberland County, Virginia
19th-century American politicians
20th-century American politicians